Acid Country is the third solo album by British artist Paul Heaton, following his debut album (under the guise of Biscuit Boy aka Crackerman) Fat Chance and second solo album as himself, The Cross Eyed Rambler.

The album was officially released for download and purchase in the shops on 13 September 2010 and charted at number 51. Heaton had done a UK "pub tour", cycling around various pubs all across the UK performing to promote his new album. Heaton has also had numerous recent radio and television appearances to promote the release of Acid Country.

Track listing 
All tracks by Paul Heaton and Jonny Lexus, except where noted

 "The Old Radio" – 4:05
 "Even A Palm Tree" – 3:55
 "It's A Young Man's Game" – 6:58
 "Welcome To The South" – 3:08
 "Life Of A Cat" – 4:23
 "House Party" – 5:57 (Heaton)
 "This House" – 4:03
 "The Ladder's Bottom Rung" – 3:57
 "Acid Country" – 7:59
 "A Cold One In The Fridge" – 5:01 (Heaton)
 "The World Over" – 5:12 (download only)

Personnel 

Tom Delgety – mixing
Sally Ellyson – vocals
Shirlaine Forrest – photography
Paul Heaton – harmonica, producer, vocals
Tom Knott – mixing
Dawn Landes – engineer
Jonny Lexus – guitar, backing vocals
Christian Madden – mellotron, omnichord, organ, piano, electric piano, producer, synthesizer
Nicky Madden – bass harmonica, engineer, saxophone
Pete Marshall – drums, glockenspiel, violin, backing vocals
Ruth Skipper – vocals
Jonny Wright – bass, backing vocals

References

2010 albums
Paul Heaton albums